Manouchehr Khosrodad (1927 – 16 February 1979) was an Iranian military major general. He was a loyal supporter of the Shah, Mohammed Reza Pahlavi, the final monarch of Iran who ruled from 1941 to 1979. He was executed following the Iranian Revolution of 1979. Khosrodad is a helicopter pilot, Head of the Equestrian Federation of Iran and a champion in horseback and also enjoyed skiing. Khosrodad was the founder and the first commander of 23rd Airborne Special Forces Brigade.
He had studied at American Defense Academy and the French military school, Saint Cyr, and Switzerland. He spoke English and French. Before the fall of the government in the Iranian Revolution, he believed that religion should not be involved in politics.

References

1979 deaths
People executed by Iran by firing squad
1927 births
Iranian aviators
Imperial Iranian Army major generals
People from Amol
Military personnel executed during the Iranian Revolution
École Spéciale Militaire de Saint-Cyr alumni